The Lonely Hill is a natural feature on the south side of Gushan Town, a northern suburb of Jingjiang City, in China's Jiangsu Province. Located some 5–6 km north of Jingjiang's city center, it is one of the city's main nature areas.

Name origin 
Jinjiang - and most of the central Jiangsu region - is situated on the Yangtze River's alluvial plain. The terrain here is generally very flat. A small isolated hill, located  some 6 km north of the Yangtze, is the only hill within a large area; for this reason the hill has become a well-known topographic feature in the region, received its name, "Lonely Hill" (Gushan). Thousands of years ago, before the Yangtze Delta we know today had formed, the Lonely Hill was a small island in the Yangtze estuary, and the only piece of dry land within the boundaries of today's Jingjiang county-level city. It is thought that it was not until 1488 that it became fully surrounded by land.

The Buddhist temple on top of the hill (Gushan Si, "The Lonely Hill Temple") and the adjacent town (Gushan Town) received their names from the hill.

Description 
It looks like a sitting lion, with the height of 53 meters and the total area is 5.8 hectares. And it covers an area of 50000 square meters. The Lonely Hill is covered with old trees, flowers and bushes, so it looks all green. It is said that Lonely Hill was developed 1800 years ago.

The Gushan Revolutionary Martyrs' Cemetery is located on the hills western slope; it occupies 107 mu (about 18 acres). According to a recent count, 1522 persons are buried there, including 1 participant of peasant wars, 336 participants of the war against Japan, 998 participants of the Chinese Civil War, 106 participants of the Korean War, and 81 persons who perished during the socialist construction.

Customs 
Smart people built a temple at the top of the hill so the hill has become a religious land now.  Every year on 3 March, there is a temple fair in Lonely Hill, attracting many people to take part in it. It is very small but that’s its feature so it will not take you a lot of time to climb it and you should not worry that you’ll feel tired. You can take your time to enjoy its beauty.

References

Hills of China
Taizhou, Jiangsu
Landforms of Jiangsu